The EOC Refugee Team has participated at the European Youth Olympic Festival summer editions in 2019 and 2022. The team competes under the flag of the European Olympic Committees and uses the code “EOC”.

2019 European Youth Summer Olympic Festival

Athletes
One refugee athlete competed at the 2019 European Youth Summer Olympic Festival in Baku, Azerbaijan.

2022 European Youth Summer Olympic Festival

Athletes
One refugee athlete competed at the 2022 European Youth Summer Olympic Festival in Banská Bystrica, Slovakia.

Results

Javelin throw

Medals

Medals by Summer Youth Olympic Festival

See also

Refugee Olympic Team at the Olympics
Athlete Refugee Team

References

Nations at the European Youth Olympic Festival
Independent athletes
Refugees